Ernestine Albertine, Countess of Lippe-Alverdissen (née Princess Ernestine Albertine of Saxe-Weimar; 28 December 1722 – 25 November 1769) was the first wife and consort of Philip II, Count of Lippe-Alverdissen.

Biography 
Princess Ernestine Albertine of Saxe-Weimar was born in Weimar on 28 December 1722 to Ernest Augustus I, Duke of Saxe-Weimar-Eisenach and Princess Eleonore Wilhelmine of Anhalt-Köthen.

On 6 May 1756 she married Philip II, Count of Lippe-Alverdissen, becoming the Countess consort of Lippe-Alverdissen. They had four children:

Count Clemens August (1757-1757)
Count Karl Wilhelm (1759-1780)
Count Georg Karl (1760-1776)
Countess Friederike Antoinette (1762-1777)

Ernestine Albertine died on 25 November 1769 in Alverdissen, seven years before her husband succeeded his cousin, Wilhelm, as the Count of Schaumburg-Lippe.

References 

1722 births
1769 deaths
18th-century German women
German countesses
German duchesses
German princesses
House of Saxe-Weimar-Eisenach
House of Lippe
Nobility from Weimar
Daughters of monarchs